Isla presidencial is an adult web animation page from Venezuela. The political satire follows the heads of state of Latin America and Spain who are stranded on an island. The three seasons amassed more than 50 million views on YouTube.

Plot

Several presidents met at the 74º Ibero-American Summit, and have a cruise after it. The cruise crashes with an big rock, and all the presidents arrive at a desert paradise island. The episodes focus on their attempts to survive in the wild or escape from the island. Some presidents who were not included in the first episodes were added later, with a plane crash.

Hugo Chávez disappears from the island, kidnapped by Barack Obama for unmentioned reasons. A malfunctioning robot that impersonates Chávez leaves Obama's secret base, until he manages to turn him off. Two presidents died during an attack of "Chávez-raptors" (savage hybrid dinosaurs with the face of Chávez), and they are finally rescued at the end of the second season.

At the beginning of the third season, the presidents are stranded on another island free of dinosaurs. Several presidents were killed off in the first and second season (corresponding to the end of their terms in real life). The show parodies pop culture, such as Jurassic Park and El Chavo del Ocho.

Production
Almost all of the characters were voiced by Emilio Lovera. The third season was released on NuevOn, one of the YouTube Original Channels.

Characters

Season 1 
 Hugo Chávez 
 Evo Morales 
 Sebastian Piñera 
 Juan Carlos I of Spain 
 Daniel Ortega 
 Cristina Fernández de Kirchner 
 Rafael Correa 
 José Mujica 
 Juan Manuel Santos 
 Barack Obama 
 Michelle Bachelet  †
 Alan García  †
 José Luis Rodríguez Zapatero  †
 Luiz Inácio Lula da Silva  †
 Felipe Calderón  †
 Fernando Lugo  †
 Manuel Zelaya  †
 Álvaro Uribe  (Escaped from the island)

Season 2 
 Nicolás Maduro 
 Evo Morales 
 Juan Manuel Santos 
 Juan Carlos I of Spain 
 Daniel Ortega 
 Rafael Correa 
 José Mujica 
 Enrique Peña Nieto 
 Mariano Rajoy 
 Dilma Rousseff 
 Sebastián Piñera 
 Barack Obama 
 Hugo Chávez  †
 Cristina Fernández de Kirchner  †
 Ollanta Humala  †

Season 3 
 Nicolás Maduro 
 Evo Morales 
 Juan Manuel Santos 
 Juan Carlos I of Spain 
 Daniel Ortega 
 Rafael Correa 
 José Mujica 
 Enrique Peña Nieto 
 Mariano Rajoy 
 Dilma Rousseff 
 Barack Obama

Reactions
Hugo Chávez mentioned an episode of the series to Evo Morales in 2011, with ABC News quoting him: "You've got to see this show, Evo!" Chávez boomed to his staff, laughing about how Morales was left snoring while "Hugito" sang until sun-up. "They sound just like us!"

Nicolás Maduro, president of Venezuela, was portrayed as a man of limited intelligence, twisted speech, and capable of talking with birds, the latter being a reference to a comment made by Maduro during the 2013 elections in Venezuela, when he said that the late Chávez had reincarnated in a little bird and talked to him to bless his candidacy. He criticized his portrayal in the animation. He said that it was not an accurate representation of his face, his moustache or his voice.

References

External links
 Youtube channel
 TV Tropes

Fictional islands
Venezuelan animated short films
Spanish-language websites
Cultural depictions of Barack Obama
YouTube channels
Venezuelan comedy websites